Dutch Masters is an American brand of natural wrapped cigars that has been sold since 1912. Its distinctive packaging features Rembrandt's 1662 painting Syndics of the Drapers' Guild. Dutch Masters cigars are currently manufactured and sold by Imperial Brands. They are machine-rolled cigars and  come in two varieties: standard cigars and smaller cigarillos. Dutch Masters are a common choice for cannabis smokers who like to roll blunts.

G.H. Johnson Cigar Company was the original producer of the Dutch Masters cigar brand. The brand became a mainstay of the Consolidated Cigar Corporation, which merged the G.H. Johnson Cigar Company and six others in 1921. The Consolidated Cigar Corp. later became part of Altadis, formed in 1999 by a merger of the French and Spanish state tobacco monopolies. 

Dutch Masters became well-known in the late 1950s and early 1960s for its sponsorship of comedian Ernie Kovacs. (Kovacs, a well known cigar smoker, never smoked Dutch Masters off camera, sticking almost exclusively to Havana cigars.)

In 2015, Dutch Masters sponsored Wrap Parties hosted by Cipha Sounds and Drewski, The MVMT.

Varieties

 Belvedere
 Cameroon Elite
 Corona De Luxe
 227 Benedict
 Corona Grape
 Corona Maduro
 Corona Sports
 Corona Strawberry
 Corona Vanilla
 Creme de Menthe
 Honey Sports
 Honey Sports Cigarillos
 Vanilla Sports
 Panetela
 Perfecto
 President
 Cigarillos - Chocolate
 Cigarillos - Cognac
 Cigarillos - Grape
 Cigarillos - Green
 Cigarillos - White Grape
 Cigarillos - Silver
 Cigarillos - Strawberry
 Cigarillos - Vanilla
 Cigarillos - Sweet
 Cigarillos - Wine
Cigarillos - Red Berry
Cigarillos - Honeycomb
Cigarillos - Bluedream fusion
Cigarillos - Atomic Fusion
Cigarillos - Berry Fusion
Cigarillos - Irish Fusion
 Palma
 Palma Chocolate
 Palma Cognac
 Tube Cigarillos Cognac
 Tube Cigarillos Grape
 Tube Cigarillos Vanilla
 Tube Cigarillos Vanilla Sport
 White Grape

References

External links
 
 The Syndics of the Clothmaker's Guild (The Staalmeesters) – Rembrandt Paintings.
 Ernie Kovacs (Tobacco & Smoking) – TVAcres.com.

Cigar brands